The "State Anthem of the Byelorussian SSR" was the regional anthem of the Byelorussian SSR, a republic of the Soviet Union. It was used from 1952 to 1991.

It took 11 years to create lyrics for it, even producing a version that mentions then-Soviet leader Joseph Stalin. The music was composed by Nestar Sakalowski, and the lyrics were written by Mikhas' Klimkovich, who also created the current national anthem.

In 1991, when the Byelorussian SSR became independent from Soviet rule as Belarus, it retained the Soviet-era regional anthem as its national one, albeit without lyrics until 2002, when new lyrics were created (this version is still in use today).

History
On 3 February 1944, the Presidium of the Supreme Soviet of the USSR issued a decree "On the State Anthems of the Soviet Republics". The Azerbaijan SSR and the Armenian SSR responded by instituting anthems by their most prominent composers, while the Lithuanian SSR reverted to its old anthem, "Tautiška giesmė".

Lyrics

1956–1991 version

1955–1956 version

Notes

References

External links
MIDI file
Instrumental recording in MP3 format (Full version)
Instrumental recording in MP3 format (Short version)
Lyrics - nationalanthems.info

Byelorussian SSR
Belarusian music
National symbols of Belarus
Byelorussian Soviet Socialist Republic
National anthem compositions in F major